Patrick Novaretti (born 5 April 1957) is a Monegasque former swimmer. He competed in three events at the 1976 Summer Olympics.

References

1957 births
Living people
Monegasque male swimmers
Olympic swimmers of Monaco
Swimmers at the 1976 Summer Olympics
Place of birth missing (living people)